Gillespie Glacier is a small tributary glacier just southwest of Mount Kenyon, descending the west slopes of the Cumulus Hills to enter Shackleton Glacier.  Named by Advisory Committee on Antarctic Names (US-ACAN) for Lester F. Gillespie, United States Antarctic Research Program (USARP) physicist at South Pole Station, winter 1962.

See also
 List of glaciers in the Antarctic
 Glaciology

References

Glaciers of Dufek Coast